The CEB Cup is an annual baseball tournament, sanctioned and created by the Confederation of European Baseball (CEB). The tournament is the second-tier tournament for baseball leagues across Europe. The winner is promoted to the CEB Champions Cup, the last-placed team is relegated to the Federations Cup.

Results

Titles by team

See also
 European Baseball Championship
 Asia Series
 Caribbean Series

References

External links
European Cup Official web site

International baseball competitions in Europe
Recurring sporting events established in 2016
WBSC Europe competitions